Gladstone is an unincorporated community in Jefferson County, Nebraska, United States.

History
Gladstone was platted in 1886 when the Chicago, Kansas and Nebraska Railway was extended to that point. It was named for William Ewart Gladstone, the Prime Minister of the United Kingdom.

References

Unincorporated communities in Jefferson County, Nebraska
Unincorporated communities in Nebraska